Breiðdalsvík is a fishing town in Iceland, located on a large cove of the same name.

The primary industry is fishing. The settlement was established relatively recently. The former general store, the oldest building in the town, is now a geological centre with exhibits devoted to the volcanologist George Walker and to the linguist and literary historian Stefán Einarsson, who was born in Breiðdalur. The former fish factory has also been preserved. Breiðdalsvík has a hotel and a craft brewery. The Breiðdalsá is popular for salmon fishing.

On 10 September 1942, Breiðdalsvík was the location of one of the few World War II air raids in Iceland: a German warplane strafed a residential building called Hamar, hitting it with 9 bullets. The building was occupied, but there were no injuries.

See also
 Breiðdalsvík Airport

References

External links
 

Populated places in Eastern Region (Iceland)